is the name for the fastest through service train among five railway companies: the Tobu Railway, Seibu Railway, Tokyo Metro, Tokyu Corporation and Yokohama Minatomirai Railway. 

This name is trademarked by the aforementioned five companies (No. 5885630).

Service pattern 
The name "F Liner" is given to trains under the two route systems explained below. The service type of trains may change once across boundary stations for two different lines. Therefore, systematically, the name "F Liner" will be added before the service type; this means all F Liner trains are referred to as "F Liner, (Service type on current line)". For instance: Within the Fukutoshin Line → "F Liner, Express", bound for Motomachi-Chūkagai; Within the Toyoko Line → "F Liner, Limited Express", bound for Shinrin-Kōen.

 Seibu Line system: Hannō / Kotesashi - Motomachi-Chūkagai
 Seibu Yurakucho Line and Ikebukuro Line: Rapid Express (快速急行)
 Tokyo Metro Fukutoshin Line: Express (急行)
 Tōkyū Tōyoko Line and Minatomirai Line: Limited Express (特急)
 Tōbu Line system: Ogawamachi / Shinrin-Kōen - Motomachi-Chūkagai
Tōbu Tōjō Line: Express (急行)
 Tokyo Metro Fukutoshin Line: Express (急行)
 Tōkyū Tōyoko Line and Minatomirai Line: Limited Express (特急)

Within the Fukutoshin Line, the Tōyoko Line and the Minatomirai Line, four F Liner trains operate every hour at 15-minute intervals during daytime: two operate on the Tōbu Line system from/to Shinrin-Kōen, and the other two operate on the Seibu Line system, with one operating from/to Hannō, and the other from/to Kotesashi, each operating at 1-hour intervals. For northbound trains on weekend mornings, only one F Liner train operates every hour which terminates at Hannō.

From 16 March 2019, the Tobu Tojo line began a new timetable, where there are 3 F Liner services that run from Ogawamachi instead of Shinrin-Kōen towards Motomachi-Chūkagai on weekends, departing at 7:54, 8:54 and 9:54. All other F Liner services that run on the Tobu Tojo line continue to start/end at Shinrin-Kōen station.

Stations served 

 Legend
 ● : Stops
 ∥ :  Does not run through here

Rolling stock 

Regularly, all F Liner trains are operated in 10-car sets.

Tobu 9000 series, Tobu 9050 series EMUs, and Tobu 50070 series EMUs
 Seibu 6000 series EMUs, and Seibu 40050 series EMUs
 Tokyo Metro 17000 series EMUs, and Tokyo Metro 10000 series EMUs
 Tokyu 5050-4000 series EMUs
 Yokohama Minatomirai Railway Y500 series EMUs (Temporary 8-car service)

Namesake 
The F in F Liner stands for 3 English words starting with the letter F, which are:

 Fast, which this train is envisioned to become
 Five, referring to through services between 5 railway companies
 Fukutoshin (副都心), Japanese for secondary city center

See also 

 S-Train
 Shonan-Shinjuku Line, a major competitor for passenger train services between Ikebukuro / Shinjuku / Shibuya and Yokohama.
 TJ Liner

Notes & references

Notes

References 
This article incorporates material from the corresponding article in the Japanese Wikipedia.

Seibu Railway
Tokyo Metro
Tokyu Corporation
Minatomirai Line
Rail transport in Tokyo
Named passenger trains of Japan